A smoking pipe is used to inhale the smoke of a burning substance; most common is a tobacco pipe, which can also accommodate almost any other substance. Pipes are commonly made from briar, heather, corn, meerschaum, clay, cherry, glass, porcelain, ebonite and acrylic.

Dutch pipe smoking 
During the 17th century, pipe smoking became a new trend among the Dutch young, in specific the upper and middle class students. These students copied the Spanish sailors and soldiers in the area by joining them in participation of pipe smoking. In particular they were interested in the novelty it brought, which was the inhale of smoke. However, the only way to smoke tobacco was through a pipe. Popularity grew throughout and became a mainstream habit for the Dutch during this time. “In a relatively short period of time, from 1590 to 1650, the Dutch Republic had gone from being a country of non-smokers to being a tobaccophile of Europe.” Typically, these young folk did their smoking in smoking rooms or parlors, also known as “tobacco houses.” They smoked for social habit, usually with other smokers. “It took more than a century for this new practice to come into fashion.” The popularity of pipes grew interest in artists. Although pipes has once been associated with the lower class, it turned into a symbol of prestige and vanity. Images of pipes could be found in numerous painting during the time. For example, in Willem Buytewech’s painting The Merry Company (circa 1620–1622), there are three young men and a woman sitting around a table with a tobacco pipe lying in the middle. Additionally, in artist Adriaen Brouwer’s portrait The Smokers (1636), he too was interested in the pipe. The smokers in the painting are sucking on their pipes.

Types
 Bowl (smoking), pipes of various designs for smoking cannabis
 Bong, also known as a water pipe
 Ceremonial pipe, used by some Native American peoples
 Chalice, a pipe used by Rastafari in cannabis rituals
 Chibouk, a long-stemmed Turkish tobacco pipe with a clay bowl, often ornamented with precious stones
 Chillum (pipe), conical smoking pipe originally from India
 Hookah, tall stemmed pipe in which the smoke is cooled and filtered by passing through water, also known as a water pipe
 Kiseru, Japanese pipe traditionally used for smoking finely shredded tobacco
 Love rose, a pipe for smoking crack cocaine
 Midwakh, small smoking pipe of Arabian origin
 Pizzo (pipe), a pipe designed for freebasing drugs
 Sebsi, traditional Moroccan smoking pipe
 TEC Pipe, Thermal electric cooling Pipe.

See also 

 Pipedia
 History and culture of substituted amphetamines
 Crack epidemic in the United States
 Smoke Works Injection Alternatives
 War on drugs

References

External links

Pipe smoking
Tobacciana
Broad-concept articles
Fur trade

bs:Lula
ko:파이프 담배
hr:Lula
hu:Pipa